Acre Prison also known as Akko Prison is a former prison and current museum in Acre, Israel.

The citadel was built during the Ottoman period over the ruins of a 12th-century Crusader fortress. The Ottomans used it at various times as a government building, prison, army barracks, and arms warehouse.

In the time of the British Mandate the citadel in the old city of Acre was used as a prison in which many Arabs were imprisoned as criminals or for participating in the 1936–1939 Arab revolt in Palestine. Around 140 prisoners were executed during the Palestinian general strike alone.

On June 17, 1930, Fuad Hijazi, ‘Ata Al-Zeer, and Mohammad Khaleel Jamjoum who participated in the incidents of 1929 were executed by hanging by the British Mandate for Palestine authorities.

On April 19, 1947 Dov Gruner and the three men (Yechiel Dresner, Mordechai Alkahi and Eliezer Kashani) captured by the British 6th Airborne Division were hanged in Acre Prison to become the first post war ‘martyrs’ of the Irgun. Dov Gruner in a broadcast declared the British Army and Administration to be ‘criminal organizations’.

Two weeks later, 4 May, the Irgun attacked the prison in the Acre Prison break, blowing a hole in the wall through which 27 Irgun prisoners escaped. 214 Arab prisoners also escaped. Three Irgun men who took part in that attack (Avshalom Haviv, Meir Nakar, and Yaakov Weiss) were captured during that attack and imprisoned and executed there.

The prison also contained Jewish prisoners, members of the Hagana, Lehi, and Irgun. One of those prisoners was Eitan Livni (father of Tzipi Livni), the Irgun operations officer. In total, the prison contained 700 Arab prisoners and 90 Jewish prisoners.

A room in the prison was occupied for some months by Bahá'u'lláh, the founder of the Baháʼí Faith, and members of his family, who were exiled to Ottoman Syria in 1868. The cell is now a site of pilgrimage for Baháʼís making a wider pilgrimage to the Baháʼí shrines in Haifa and Bahji, outside Akko.

See also
Acre Prison break
Exodus (1960 film), directed by Otto Preminger, based on the novel Exodus, by Leon Uris.
Olei Hagardom

References

Prisons in Israel
Prison